Ulansuhai Nur  or Wuliangsuhai（）is a freshwater lake in China, it is located in southwest of Inner Mongolia, situated in the north bank of the middle reaches of Yellow River. The lake is 233 km 2, with a drainage area of 11,800 km 2, an elevation of 1018.79 m, length 35.4 km and mean width 6.6 km (max 12.7 km). The lake is rich in fish. Ulansuhai Nur is a rare big  multi-functional lake in this desolate and drought-stricken grassland. The area of bulrush is 150 square kilometers and there are nearly 200 species of birds and over 20 kinds of fish in the lake area.

Notes

Lakes of Inner Mongolia